I Want to Be Your Property is a 1987 dance hit by Blue Mercedes.  The single was most successful on the dance charts, making it to number one for four weeks and was the most successful dance single of 1988.  "I Want to Be Your Property" was a crossover hit on the pop singles chart, and broke into the top 30 on the UK singles chart.

Music video
In reference to a line in the song's lyrics, actress/dancer, Cyd Charisse, appears in the group's video.

Chart positions

References

1987 singles
Dance-pop songs
1987 songs